Natural Soul (subtitled Natural Woman) is an album by American saxophonist Buddy Terry recorded in 1967 and released on the Prestige label.

Reception

The Allmusic site awarded the album 3 stars.

Track listing
All compositions by Buddy Terry except as noted
 "A Natural Woman" (Carole King, Gerry Goffin, Jerry Wexler) – 3:30
 "Natural Soul"(Sunday Go to Meeting Blues)" – 6:00
 "Pedro, the One Arm Bandit" – 5:37
 "Don't Be So Mean" – 5:35
 "The Revealing Time" – 12:35
 "Quiet Days and Lonely Nights" – 7:35

Personnel
Buddy Terry – tenor saxophone, flute
Larry Young – piano, organ
Eddie Gladden – drums
Woody Shaw – trumpet, flugelhorn (tracks 2, 4 & 5)
Joe Thomas – tenor saxophone, flute (track 1) 
Robbie Porter – baritone saxophone (tracks 1 & 2)
Jiggs Chase – organ (track 1)
Wally Richardson – guitar (tracks 1 & 2)
Jimmy Lewis – electric bass (track 1)
The Terry Girls – vocals (track 1)

References

Prestige Records albums
Buddy Terry albums
1968 albums
Albums produced by Cal Lampley
Albums recorded at Van Gelder Studio